Mark Weprin (born June 5, 1961) represented District 23 in the New York City Council, then the most ethnically diverse district in New York City, which contains the Queens neighborhoods of Hollis Hills, Queens Village, Little Neck, Douglaston, Bayside, Bellerose, Floral Park, Glen Oaks, New Hyde Park, Hollis, Hollis Park Gardens, Holliswood, Fresh Meadows, and Oakland Gardens.

Career
Weprin holds an undergraduate degree in Communications from State University of New York at Albany, as well as a J.D. from Brooklyn Law School. Weprin was an associate at the law firm of Shea & Gould. He has also worked in the administration of former mayor Edward I. Koch and as an account executive in public relations and marketing.

New York State Assembly
Weprin was chosen to replace his father, former Speaker of the Assembly Saul Weprin, in a special election held in 1994. Weprin was Chairman of the Standing Committee on Small Business, as well as a member of the Aging, Codes, Insurance and Judiciary committees. He also served as Chairman of the Assembly Ethics and Guidance Committee, as well as Co-Chair of the Joint Senate/Assembly Legislative Ethics Commission. Prior to that, he served in the capacity of Secretary to the Majority Conference and Chairman of the Subcommittee for Outreach and Oversight of Senior Citizen Programs.

New York City Council
On November 3, 2009, Weprin was elected to represent the 23rd district of the New York City Council, which encompasses a large portion of North Eastern Queens, replacing his brother David, who had chosen to run for New York City Comptroller instead of reelection to the City Council, but lost the Democratic primary election.

In May 2015, Weprin announced that he would resign from his position on the New York City Council to become a Federal and State legislative deal- breaker for the Cuomo Administration.  Weprin's new title is Deputy Secretary of Legislative Affairs. Weprin officially left office on June 14, 2015. His seat remained empty until the general election in November. Barry Grodenchik was elected and to serve out the remainder of Weprin's term until 2017.

References

External links

Biography: New York State Democratic Committee
Queens Courier
Gotham Gazette's Eye On Albany: New York State Assembly: District 24
 

1961 births
Democratic Party members of the New York State Assembly
New York City Council members
Brooklyn Law School alumni
American politicians of Cuban descent
Hispanic and Latino American state legislators in New York (state)
Jewish American state legislators in New York (state)
University at Albany, SUNY alumni
Living people
Politicians from Queens, New York
Lawyers from New York City
21st-century American Jews